The Sacramento Sirens are a women's semi-professional American football team, located in Sacramento, California. The team has compiled one of the most successful records in women's full tackle football.

History
In 2001, their first year of existence, the Sirens won the divisional title and advanced to the playoffs of the Women's American Football League. In 2002 the Sirens took the league title in the championship game against the Arizona Caliente.

Joining a larger league in 2003, the Independent Women's Football League (IWFL), the Sirens traveled to New York to capture their second consecutive championship title, beating the New York Sharks. In 2004 Sacramento hosted the IWFL National Championship game where the Sirens defeated their New York rival again. A year later, in Manchester, New Hampshire, the Sirens defeated the Atlanta Xplosion in the 2005 IWFL national championship.

In 2006 the Sirens had another successful year for the Sirens, as they finished 6–2 to win another division title and defeat the Portland Shockwave in the Western Conference Semifinal.  However, one week later, the Sirens lost the Western Conference Championship to the Detroit Demolition by a score of 50–32, marking the first time in five years that the Sirens did not win their league's championship.

In 2007, the Sirens finished 7–1, winning another division title and defeating the Seattle Majestics in the semifinal round.  As they had done the year before, the Sirens would lose the conference championship again to the Detroit Demolition, this time by a score of 49–0.

But in 2008, the Sirens had an undeniably most disappointing season yet.  Finishing at 4-4 and fourth place in the Pacific Northwest division, the Sirens, for the first time in team history had failed to win the division championship, qualify for the playoffs, or accomplish a winning season.

In 2009, the Sirens returned to their winning ways, finishing 5–3.  However, that was still not enough for the Sirens to return to the playoffs.

However, 2010 marked the Sirens' return to dominance, as they finished 8-0 and once again won the Pacific West division title.  The Sirens faced the Boston Militia in the IWFL national championship game on July 24, 2010, and lost 39–7.

Season-By-Season

|-
| colspan="6" align="center" | Sacramento Sirens (WAFL)
|-
|2001 || 7 || 2 || 1 || 1st Pacific Central Division|| Lost Pacific Conference Semifinal (California)
|-
|2001 || 0 || 1 || 0 || Post Season||
|-
| colspan="6" align="center" | Sacramento Sirens (WAFC)
|-
|2002 || 8 || 0 || 0 || 1st League || Won WAFC Semifinal (Oakland)Won WAFC Championship (Arizona)
|-
|2002 || 2 || 0 || 0 || Post Season||
|-
| colspan="6" align="center" | Sacramento Sirens (IWFL)
|-
|2003 || 8 || 0 || 0 || 1st West Pacific SouthWest || Won Western Conference Semifinal (Seattle)Won Western Conference Championship (Chicago)Won IWFL Championship (New York)
|-
|2003 || 3 || 0 || 0 || Post Season|-
|2004 || 7 || 1 || 0 || 1st West Pacific West || Won Western Conference Semifinal (Seattle)Won Western Conference Championship (Corvallis)Won IWFL Championship (New York)
|-
|2004 || 3 || 0 || 0 || Post Season
|-
|2005 || 10 || 0 || 0 || 1st West Pacific Southwest || Won Western Conference Semifinal (Corvallis)Won Western Conference Championship (Seattle)Won IWFL Championship (Atlanta)
|-
|2005 || 3 || 0 || 0 || Post Season|-
|2006 || 6 || 2 || 0 || 1st West Pacific Southwest || Won Western Conference Semifinal (Portland)Lost Western Conference Championship (Detroit)
|-
|2006 || 1 || 1 || 0 || Post Season
|-
|2007 || 7 || 1 || 0 || 1st West Pacific Southwest || Won Western Conference Semifinal (Seattle)Lost Western Conference Championship (Detroit)
|-
|2007 || 1 || 1 || 0 || Post Season|-
|2008 || 4 || 4 || 0 || 4th West Pacific Northwest || --
|-
|2009 || 5 || 3 || 0 || 2nd West Pacific Southwest || --
|-
|2010 || 8 || 0 || 0 || 1st West Pacific West || Won Pacific West Division Championship (So Cal)Won Western Conference Championship (Dallas)Lost  IWFL Championship (Boston)
|-
|2010 || 2 || 1 || 0 || Post Season
|-
|2011 || 5 || 4 || 0 || 1st West Pacific Southwest ||Lost Western Conference Semifinal (California)
|-
|2011 || 0 || 1 || 0 || Post Season|-
|2012 || 7 || 1 || 0 || 1st West Pacific Southwest ||Won Western Conference Semifinal (Seattle)Won Western Conference Championship (Wisconsin)Lost IWFL Championship (Montreal)
|-
|2012 || 2 || 1 || 0 || Post Season||
|-
| colspan="6" align="center" | Sacramento Sirens (WFA)
|-
|2013 || 4 || 3 || 0 || -- ||
|-
|2013 || 1 || 1 || 0 || Post Season||
|-
| colspan="6" align="center" | Sacramento Sirens
|-
|2014 || 0 || 0 || 0 || Team Inactive |||-
| colspan="6" align="center" | Sacramento Sirens (IWFL)
|-
|2015 || 8 || 0 || 0 || 1st Pacific West Division|| Lost Pacific Conference Semifinal (Utah)
|-
|2015 || 0 || 1 || 0 || Post Season
|-
| colspan="6" align="center" | Sacramento Sirens (IWFL)
|-
|2016*|| 0 || 0 || 0 || -- ||
|-
|Totals || 112 || 29 || 1
|colspan="2"| (including post season)

* = Current Standing

Season schedules

2009

2010

External links
Sacramento Sirens official website

Independent Women's Football League
American football teams in Sacramento, California
American football teams in California
American football teams established in 2001
2001 establishments in California
Women's sports in California